Putka (Quechua for "muddy", also spelled potga or putca) may refer to:

 Putka (Lima), a mountain in the Lima Region, Peru
 Putka (Huánuco), a mountain in the Huánuco Region, Peru
 Putka (Junín), a mountain in the Junín Region, Peru
 Putka, a populated place in Bangladesh